Around The World is the third studio album released by Latvian instrumental cello rock trio Melo-M. The album is produced by trio member Kārlis Auzāns and recorded 2009 at Chellout Studios in Riga, Latvia. The album consists of 12 instrumental cover version tracks and a cover version track featuring Latvian singer Intars Busulis.

Personnel 
Kārlis Auzāns (alias Charlie Lee)cello, percussion
Valters Pūce (alias Walis Shmuls)cello
Antons Trocjuks (alias Tonny Trolly)cello

Track listing 

2009 albums
Melo-M albums